CrystalGraphics is the developer of the PowerPoint sharing website PowerShow.com, as well as templates and plug-ins for PowerPoint and Office products. Some of CrystalGraphics' products include PowerPoint templates, 2D and 3D special-effects, video backgrounds, charting, animations and other add-ons. The company was founded by Dennis Ricks in 1986 and is based in Santa Clara, California.

Achievements 
CrystalGraphics was the first company to introduce 3D transitions for PowerPoint.

See also 
AuthorSTREAM
Windows Live
Microsoft

References

External links 

Presentation